Barium acetylacetonate is a compound with formula Ba(C5H7O2)2. It is the Ba2+ complex of the anion acetylacetonate.  The compound is typically encountered as an ill-defined hydrate, which would accord with the high coordination number characteristic of barium.

Uses

Barium acetylacetonate has been examined in metal organic chemical vapour deposition of BaTiO3 thin films.

References

Barium compounds
Acetylacetonate complexes